The Pennington County Courthouse, located at 315 St. Joseph Street in Rapid City, is the county courthouse serving Pennington County, South Dakota. The courthouse has functioned as the seat of Pennington County government since it was built in 1922. Architecture firm W. E. Hulse & Company of Hutchinson, Kansas designed the building in the Beaux-Arts style. The three-story building is built from Indiana limestone and has terra cotta trim. The two-story front entrance is divided into sections by four pairs of Ionic columns; three large arched windows decorated with muntin and topped by keystones decorate the three main sections. The entrance, located at what would be the bottom of the middle window, features iron grilles on its windows and transom and is topped by a cartouche. A frieze with ornamental medallions and a dentillated cornice surround the building above its second story.

The courthouse was added to the National Register of Historic Places on May 28, 1976.

References

Courthouses on the National Register of Historic Places in South Dakota
County courthouses in South Dakota
Beaux-Arts architecture in South Dakota
Government buildings completed in 1922
Buildings and structures in Pennington County, South Dakota
National Register of Historic Places in Pennington County, South Dakota